Victor Salazar was an American businessman, political figure and officeholder.

The name may also refer to:

 Víctor Salazar (footballer, born 1991), Colombian footballer
 Víctor Salazar (footballer, born 1993), Argentine footballer
 Víctor Salazar, fictional character from the television series Love, Victor

See also
Víctor Zalazar, Argentine boxer